A sweet sixteen is a coming of age party celebrating a person's 16th birthday, mainly celebrated in some parts of the United States and Canada. While some families throw large, lavish celebrations, others choose to celebrate the birthday as if it were a normal occurrence. This event can be formal, casual, or semi-formal.

While traditionally it is common that sweet sixteens are mostly celebrated by girls, they can also be celebrated by boys. Sweet sixteens can range from modest parties at home with close family to large parties with a hired DJ, makeup, hair styling, expensive gowns and dresses, and hotel ballrooms. Even if it is a small party, the main purpose of the party is to celebrate the person's earliest stage of adulthood.

Alternative sweet sixteen celebrations in the United States can include a religious or church ceremony also, like a Mass or a blessing at church. This religious or church ceremony has its origins in the Quinceañera style, but since there are many American-born Hispanic people, many choose to blend a sweet sixteen American style with their Quinceañera tradition. For example, the girl may go to the church for the religious ceremony and, then, while in the party, choose to have the sixteen-candle ceremony. The religious ceremony comes from the Hispanic tradition, while the sixteen candles ceremony comes from the American tradition.

Traditions

Shoe ceremony
For girls, the shoe ceremony is common at Quinceañeras parties. In this ceremony, the birthday girl sits down in a chair while her father, grandfather, Godfather, Uncle, or brother approaches her, carrying a decorative pillow with high heels on top. The girl would traditionally be wearing flat shoes, such as slippers, and the father ceremoniously helps her into her new high heels. This is symbolic of the girl transitioning into a woman.

Tiara ceremony
The tiara ceremony is similar to the shoe ceremony, except the mother or a strong female figure approaches with a tiara instead of shoes and places it on her daughter's head to symbolize her becoming a woman. Sometimes this is combined with the shoe ceremony so that two people approach the birthday girl, one with a pillow with high heels, and the other with a pillow with a tiara.

Candle-lighting ceremony
This tradition is most common in Bar and Bat Mitzvahs, Quinceaneras and sweet sixteens, although in different ages. There are typically 16 candles, each of which are given to special family members and friends by the birthday girl. Usually, when the recipient of the candle is named, a few words are said by the birthday girl in regards to why this person (or people) is special to them, they may tell a short story or fun memory they have shared with that person. Although the birthday girl can decide to give her candles to whomever she chooses, in whichever order she wants, here is the traditional order of candles:

- Each of the 16 candles holds a special meaning...
The first candle is for the girl's parents or guardians.
The second candle is for the siblings. (If there are no siblings, then this candle can represent the grandparents.)
Candles 3, 4, 5 and 6 are for the rest of the family members.
Candles 7, 8, 9, 10, 11, 12, 13 and 14 are for friends.
Candle 15 is for the girl's best friend or friends.
The 16th candle is for the boyfriend or the closest male friend.
Some add a 17th candle which represents good luck.

First car
In Canada and many states in the United States, the minimum age to legally drive a car is 16. Sometimes, although rarely, the birthday person is gifted a car as a birthday present. The car can be either purchased new, used, or simply be gifted from one person to another (often within their family).

Other specific coming of age parties

Latin America

Similar celebrations are found in different cultures around the world, such as the quinceañera in Hispanic countries and the festa de debutantes in Brazil, both at 15 years of age.

Philippines

In the Philippines, the debut (pronounced 'de-boo) celebrates a young woman's 18th birthday. A young man may also celebrate his own debut on his 21st birthday, albeit with less formal celebrations or none at all.

Japanese

Coming of Age Day (成人の日, Seijin no Hi) is a Japanese holiday held annually. It is held in order to congratulate and encourage all those who have reached or will reach the age of maturity. Festivities include coming of age ceremonies (成人式, seijin-shiki) held at local and prefectural offices, as well as after-parties among family and friends.

Judaism

In Conservative and Orthodox Judaism, girls reach maturity at the age of 12, celebrated with a bat mitzvah, and for boys (and girls, in the Reform movement) at the age of 13, with a bar mitzvah, or for both, with a B'nai mitzvah and both girls, with a b'not mitzvah. These are important dates in the Jewish culture, because following these ceremonies, bar or bat mitzvah, the young person is considered an adult.

Christianity
In many Christian denominations, both girls and boys reach the age of spiritual maturity at around the age of 13 or 14, with the Sacrament of Confirmation.

Popular culture

Music
Songs that talk about or represent sweet 16s.

 "When You Were Sweet Sixteen" - Written by James Thornton, published 1898, #3 hit for Harry McDonough in 1901
 "16 Candles" - recorded by the Crests and several other artists, including Roy Orbison
 "Happy Birthday Sweet Sixteen" - Neil Sedaka
"Sweet Little Sixteen" - Chuck Berry
 "Sweet Sixteen" - Iggy Pop
 "Sweet Sixteen" - Billy Idol
 "Sweet Sixteen" (no connection to the Billy Idol version) - Hilary Duff, it later became the theme song for MTV's reality show My Super Sweet 16.
 "You're Sixteen" - written by the Sherman Brothers, recorded by Johnny Burnette, Ringo Starr and others.
 "My Little Girl" - Tim McGraw
 "Butterfly Kisses" - Bob Carlisle
 "Dear god" - Kevin Gates
 "Only Sixteen" - Sam Cooke

Film & television
Sixteen Candles - This 1984 American coming-of-age comedy film, by director John Hughes, stars Molly Ringwald and Anthony Michael Hall. It tells the story of a young woman's disappointment when her family forgets her 16th birthday because they are focused on preparing for her older sister's wedding the following day. 
 My Super Sweet 16 - Aly & AJ, Demetrius, son of Timbaland, Erin Wright, daughter of the late Eazy-E, Carlysia Levert, daughter of the late Gerald Levert, Teyana Taylor, Cher Hubsher, sMothered, Reginae Carter, daughter of Lil' Wayne, Justin Combs and Quincy Brown, son and stepson of Sean "Diddy" Combs, Kristy Landers, daughter of Tom Niedenfuer and Judy Launders, Romeo, Cymphonique and Itali Miller, children of Master P, Noah Urrea, Destiny, daughter of former N.F.L. star Ray Buchanan, Sierra , daughter of CeeLo Green, Darnell and Lea Robinson, children of Sugar Hill Records president Leland Robinson, Svetlana, Real World Key West, DJ Tillman, stepson of NFL player Danny Clark, Christy, daughter of DJ Spinderella of "Salt-N-Pepa" and former NBA star Kenny Anderson, Aaron, son of record executive LA Reid, Etienne, son of actress Sheyrl Lee Ralph
Shake It Up - The episode Sweet 16 It Up where two of the main characters celebrate their Sweet 16 birthday.
Keeping Up with the Kardashians - Kendall Jenner and Kylie Jenner
Cake Boss - Mary, Bartolina, Dominique, Teresa "Tessa" and Sofia, nieces and daughter of Buddy Valastro
Dance Moms - Nia Sioux, JoJo Siwa, Chloe Lukasiak, Kalani Hilliker
America's Next Top Model - Jaslene Gonzalez

Celebrity sweet 16'ners
Sophie Simmons, daughter of KISS Gene Simmons and Playboy model Shannon Tweed
Madison Pettis
Zendaya
Keke Palmer
Olivia Holt
Miley and Noah Cyrus, daughters of Billy Ray Cyrus
China McClain
Baylee Littrell, son of Backstreet Boys Brian Littrell and actress/model Leighanne Littrell

See also 
 Quinceañera
 Bar and bat mitzvah
 Age 16
 My Super Sweet 16
 Philippine debut
 Cug Huê Hng

References 

Birthdays
Rites of passage
Adolescence
Observances in the United States
Observances in Canada